The 2008–09 Leinster Rugby season was Leinster's eighth competing in the Celtic League alongside which they competed in the 2008–09 Heineken Cup. Though Leinster were ultimately to lose their Celtic League crown to rivals Munster, they were to cap a great year for Irish rugby with their victory over the Leicester Tigers in the Heineken Cup Final at Murrayfield.

Squad

Match Attendance 
Leinster's average Celtic League attendance was 14,728, up 415 on the 2007-08 season.

Leinster's Heineken Cup semi final against Munster, held in Croke Park set the record for the highest attendance in club rugby history at over 82,000.

2008–09 Celtic League Fixtures

League table

2008/09 Heineken Cup Fixtures/Results

Pool Table

Knock-out stages

See also 
2008–09 Celtic League
2008–09 Heineken Cup
2009 Heineken Cup Final

References

2008–09
2008–09 Celtic League by team
2008–09 in Irish rugby union
2008–09 Heineken Cup by team